Zabideh or Zobeideh or Zobeydeh may refer to:
 Zobeydeh, Kerman
 Zobeydeh, Khuzestan
 Zobeydeh-ye Ariyez, Khuzestan Province
 Zobeydeh Dubat, Khuzestan Province
 Zabideh, South Khorasan